Hubbard College of Administration International is an accredited school that teaches administration using methods developed by Church of Scientology founder, L. Ron Hubbard. The headquarters for the school is located at 320 North Vermont Avenue, Los Angeles, California 90004.  The school began operations in 1990 and its current headquarters were established in 2001. It is a 501(c)(3) public charity, and as a religious organization does not file an annual return, however it states itself to be a "secular educational institution".

Admission requirements 
Students are not required to have a high school diploma to gain early admission and start taking courses at the school.  Students are not required to take the ACT or SAT tests to gain admission.  The school does have an application form that must be completed and submitted with a $150 fee.  The school requests letters of recommendation and says it tests students for IQ, leadership qualities, and reading level.  The admission process may also include interviews to determine an applicant's qualifications and desire to further his/her education.

Programs offered 
The school grants a "Specialized Associate Degree Program" which it calls, "Associate of Applied Science Degree of Management and Administration".  The school also offers "Continuing Education Certificate Programs".  There also exist a number of "Public Workshops and Corporate Programs" which are short courses on specific topics.  The school also provides WISE certificate programs; WISE being a Scientology-affiliated business group.

Hubbard College of Administration has Institutional Accreditation from the 
Accrediting Council for Continuing Education and Training.

Cost 
As of October, 2006, the tuition for the "degree program" costs $30,179; books and supplies cost $2,643.28; the total cost is $32,852.28.  Costs for the continuing education programs range from ~$3000 to ~$18,000.  Costs of public workshops and corporate programs are ~$250.  WISE certificate programs range from ~$6000 to $8000.

The school's website says that financial aid is available, however, since the school is not accredited, students are not eligible to participate in any federally-funded financial aid programs, such as Pell Grants, Perkins Loans, or any other government assisted loan programs.

As of January, 2015, the tuition for the "degree program" costs $52,000–books and supplies excluded.

Teaching 
The school teaches a method of business administration developed by L. Ron Hubbard.  The school uses a teaching method called "Study Technology", also developed by Hubbard, as a method of teaching its students.  The school does not have semesters or terms.  Students can begin taking courses at any time of the year and they may attend either full-time or part-time.

See also
 Scientology as a Business
 Sterling Management Systems

References

Unaccredited institutions of higher learning in California
Scientology-related schools
World Institute of Scientology Enterprises-affiliated organizations
Organizations based in Los Angeles